The 2008 Eastern League season began on April 3 and the regular season ended on September 1. The All Star Game was played on July 16 at Merchantsauto.com Stadium in Manchester, New Hampshire. The Playoffs began on September 3 with the Divisional Series.  The Akron Aeros defeated the Bowie Baysox in the Southern Division Championship Series and the Trenton Thunder defeated the Portland Sea Dogs in the Northern Division Championship Series.  The Trenton Thunder defeated the Akron Aeros to win the Eastern League Championship Series.

Standings

League leaders

Stats

Batting leaders

Pitching leaders

Regular season

Opening Day

April 3 was the Opening Day of the 2008 Eastern League season. The following games are scheduled.
Akron Aeros @ Harrisburg Senators – Senators won 8–5
Erie SeaWolves @ Bowie Baysox – Postponed (rain)
New Hampshire Fisher Cats @ Connecticut Defenders – Defenders won 3–2
Portland Sea Dogs @ New Britain Rock Cats – Sea Dogs won 3–0
Reading Phillies @ Altoona Curve – Phillies won 8–3
Trenton Thunder @ Binghamton Mets – Mets won 2–0

All-star game

The 2008 Eastern League All-Star Game was the 6th midseason exhibition between the all-stars of the Northern Division and the Southern Division, the two divisions comprising the Eastern League. The game was played on July 16, 2008 at Merchantsauto.com Stadium in Manchester, New Hampshire, home of the New Hampshire Fisher Cats of the Northern Division. The North All-Stars defeated the South All-Stars, 5–3.

Playoffs

Divisional Series

Northern Division

The Trenton Thunder defeated the Portland Sea Dogs in the Northern Division playoffs 3 games to 0.

Southern Division

The Akron Aeros defeated the Bowie Baysox in the Southern Division playoffs 3 games to 1. The Akron Aeros won their fourth consecutive Southern Division Championship in a row and four of the last five years

Championship series

For the second straight season, the Trenton Thunder defeated the Akron Aeros in the ELCS 3 games to 1.

References

 
Eastern League seasons